The Hospital of St John the Baptist is a charitable foundation in Winchester, Hampshire, England, and the building itself was an almshouse established in 1085.

External links
  City of Winchester, UK

Buildings and structures in Winchester
Winchester
Hospitals established in the 11th century
Charitable hospitals
1085 establishments in England